Pernem Assembly constituency is one of the 40 Goa Legislative Assembly constituencies of the state of Goa in southern India. Pernem is also one of the 20 constituencies falling under the North Goa Lok Sabha constituency. Pernem constituency is reserved for candidates belonging to the scheduled castes.

Members of the Legislative Assembly 

Defection from MGP to BJP

Election results

2022 election 

 -->

2017

See also
 List of constituencies of the Goa Legislative Assembly
 North Goa district
 Dargalim (Goa Assembly constituency)

Notes

References

External links
 

Assembly constituencies of Goa
North Goa district